Multimodal cancer therapy, often referred to simply as multimodal therapy or multimodal cancer care, is an approach for treatment of cancer that combines of radiation and chemotherapy likes multiple therapeutic modalities. For example, in the case of mesotheliomas, treatments combine modalities such as surgery, chemotherapy, immunotherapy, and radiotherapy.  Multimodal treatments can often have synergistic effects leading to better clinical outcomes.

Diverse types of cancer can be treated via a multimodal approach, including non-small cell lung cancer and gastric cancer.

See also 
 Treatment of cancer

References

Citations 
 

 

 

 

 

Oncology
Cancer